Thabo Motang (born 20 November 1967) is a Motswana football coach and former player currently managing Township Rollers in the Botswana Premier League. Often regarded as one of the best Botswana goalkeepers of all time, he played for several teams including Township Rollers, where he became one of their longest serving players, BMC and Mahalapye United Hotpurs.

Motang began his career with Township Rollers as a twenty year old in 1987. Staying twelve years with the Gaborone-based outfit, in which he became one of their longest serving players, Motang won two league titles and three FA Cups. He then moved to Lobatse-based BMC, helping them gain promotion to the top flight in his last season. He joined Mahalapye United Hotspurs in 2004 as a player-manager and finally retired from playing altogether in 2006.

Early life
Motang was born in the Borolong area of Goodhope but was raised up in Selebi-Phikwe. He began playing football at primary school, functioning primarily as a defensive midfielder. After a game in which Mmoloki Sechele scored from the centre line Motang angrily took over as goalkeeper and never relinquished the role.

Club career

Township Rollers
Motang debuted for Rollers in 1987 aged 20. Although Rollers at the time had experienced goalkeepers like Sam Sono, Kabelo Otukile and Mchuu Manyelela, Motang quickly asserted himself  as the number one choice. He stayed twelve years at the club, outlasting younger keepers such as Lesego Moeng and becoming a firm fan favourite.

Botswana Meat Commission
In 1999 Motang moved to BMC, then plying their trade in the second division of Botswana football. Although he played a starring role in helping the team earn promotion to the top league twice, he eventually subsided and became a backup for Reuben Mosweu.

Mahalapye United Hotspurs
After announcing his professional retirement in 2004 Motang resurfaced at Mahalpye-based Hotspurs as a player-manager. Primarily the coach, he was also the third-choice goalkeeper and goalkeeper coach. He officially retired from active playing in 2006 and took over full-time as the goalkeeper coach.

International career
Motang first came to prominence in 1984 while still playing secondary school football. He was selected for various youth tournaments which he played with Botswana U20. He made his senior debut in a 2-1 win against Zambia in 1988. During his playing career Botswana never qualified for any major tournaments. He was criticised by fans in 1992 after seemingly blaming his teammate Mooketsi Mading for a 6-0 defeat against Ivory Coast.

Managerial career
Motang began coaching while playing for Mahalapye United Hotspurs from 2004 to 2006. In 2006 he took over full-time as the goalkeeper coach. Two years later he moved to his former club Township Rollers and was soon applauded as the best goalkeeper coach in Botswana after contributing significantly to the development of Kabelo Dambe. In 2014, after helping Rollers win two league titles and a cup, Motang landed in hot water after taking the club to court over unpaid wages, leading to him being given an unpaid suspension. Eventually the two parted ways, with Motang being appointed Extension Gunners assistant manager, though he acted as the manager following the departure of Odirile Matlhaku.
Motang stayed with the Peleng giants for only one season before joining Gaborone United ahead of the 2015-16 season. However, in January of the same season he returned to Township Rollers as goalkeeper coach and joint assistant manager. He remained in that post until he was announced as the new head coach on 4 July 2022 following the departure of French-born manager Romain Folz.

Honours

Club
 Township Rollers
Botswana Premier League:2
1987, 1995
Botswana FA Cup:3
1993, 1994, 1996

 Botswana Meat Commission
Botswana First Division South:1
2001-02

References

1967 births
Living people
Botswana footballers
Township Rollers F.C. players
Association football goalkeepers
Botswana international footballers